Ayee Milan Ki Raat is a 1991 Bollywood musical romantic film directed by K. Pappu, starring Avinash Wadhavan, Shaheen, Aruna Irani, Alok Nath, Anupam Kher and Rita Bhaduri.

Cast 
 Rita Bhaduri as Thakur's wife
 Aruna Irani as Suraj's mother
 Kulbhushan Kharbanda as Thakur
 Anupam Kher as Bajrangi / Sumer Singh / Baldev Singh
 Avinash Wadhavan as Suraj 
 Shaheen as Kiran, Suraj's love interest
 Paresh Rawal as Yogiraj
 Alok Nath as Hari Ram, Suraj's father
 Kunika Sadanand as Dhanno
 Sushmita Mukherjee as Baldev Singh's wife
 Birbal as Munim

Soundtrack 
All songs were very popular with the songs "Mat Ro Mere Dil" and "Ishq Da Rog Laga" being chartbusters. The most popular singer duo of the late 1980s and early 1990s Anuradha Paudwal & Mohammed Aziz sang most of the songs.

External links 
 
 

1991 films
Films scored by Anand–Milind
1990s Hindi-language films
Films directed by K. Pappu
T-Series (company) films